True Stories may refer to:

 True Stories (film), a 1986 film by Talking Heads frontman David Byrne
 True Stories (Talking Heads album), a 1986 Talking Heads album featuring songs from the film
 Sounds from True Stories, the soundtrack from the film
 Avicii: True Stories, a 2017 documentary directed by Levan Tsikurishvili about the DJ and record producer Avicii
 True Stories (Martin Simpson album), a 2009 album by Martin Simpson
 True Stories (The Rippingtons album), a 2016 album by The Rippingtons
 True Stories (collection), a 1981 collection of poetry by Canadian author Margaret Atwood
 True Stories (Documentary) (TV series), a British television documentary series which aired on Channel 4
 True Stories (TV series), an Australian television series which aired on the Seven Network, hosted by Anna Coren
 True Stories, a 2004 Nathan Rogers album
 True Stories, a 1978 David Sancious album
 True Stories, memoirs of Russian gulag inmate and writer Lev Razgon
 True Stories: Selected Non-Fiction, a 1996 book by Helen Garner

See also
 True Story (disambiguation)
 Based on a True Story (disambiguation)